According to a Wendish legend, Plusso or Blusso (a renowned Wendish pagan) killed Johannes Scotus, Bishop of Mecklenburg in sacrifice to Radegast during a pagan rebellion against Christianity in the Holy Roman Empire on November 10, 1066. Plusso delivered the bishop's head on a stake in the Radegast temple at Rethra and danced with his wife Guidda (sister to Gottschalk), in celebration of the deed.

Slavic mythology
960s establishments in the Holy Roman Empire